The 1993 Romanian Open was a men's tennis tournament held on outdoor clay courts in Bucharest, Romania that was part of the World Series of the 1993 ATP Tour . It was the inaugural edition of the tournament and was held from 13 September through 19 September 1993. Top-seeded Goran Ivanišević won the singles title and earned $71,000 first-prize money.

Finals

Singles

 Goran Ivanišević defeated  Andrei Cherkasov 6–2,7–6(7–5)
 It was Ivanišević's 1st singles title of the year and the 7th of his career.

Doubles
 Menno Oosting /  Libor Pimek defeated  George Cosac /  Ciprian Petre Porumb 7–6, 7–6

References

External links
 ITF tournament edition details
 ATP tournament profile

Romanian Open
Romanian Open
R
September 1993 sports events in Europe